Bruno Beltrão (born 19 September 1979 in Niteroi) is a Brazilian choreographer  who has worked since 1996 with his Grupo de Rua (GRN). He uses urban dance styles in the context of conceptual theatre and has mixed various influences, including hip hop, to form abstract choreographic landscapes.

Since childhood, Beltrão wanted to direct films and was fascinated by cinematographic and computer-generated three-dimensional universes. However, at the age of 13 years, he began to dance in matinees in his hometown, where he started his unexpected relationship with hip hop. In 1994 received his first dance lesson from the Israeli teacher Yoram Szabo. A year later, his studies was interrupted and he begins to teach street dance in academies of the city.

In 1996, at age 16, he created the Grupo de Rua de Niterói with his friend Rodrigo Bernardi. During its first two years, GRN was dedicated to competitive dance and made appearances at festivals and on television. During this period, while they lived intensely the hip hop world, the way the techniques of street dance were usually translated to the stage no longer attracted the group's interest as before. On the contrary, they started to desire to bring hip hop dance out of the limitations of its own definition.

In 2000, Beltrão enrolled in the dance faculty of the "Centro Universitário da Cidade", in Rio de Janeiro. In 2001 the duet piece "From Popping to Pop" debuted at the Duos de Dança no Sesc, in Copacabana. This piece was Beltrão's official debut on the contemporary dance scene in Rio de Janeiro. It was also a turning point in the career of the choreographer, who started to develop a personal vision for the dance he has been doing. Also in 2001, he created "Me and my choreographer in 63", with the dancer Eduardo Hermanson. At the end of that year, Rodrigo Bernardi left the company and Bruno assumed the direction of Grupo de Rua.

Since then he has choreographed "Too Legit to Quit" (2002), "Telesquat" (2003), "H2" (2005),  "H3" (2008), "Cracks" (2013) and "Inoah" (2017)

In 2002, Grupo de Rua started touring internationally. They have presented in 33 countries (Portugal, Spain, France, Germany, Belgium, Holland, Austria, Switzerland, Luxembourg, Croatia, Finland, Sweden, Italy, Scotland, England, Singapore, Canada, Argentina, Uruguay, Japan, South Korea, Morocco, Egypt, Jordan, Lebanon, Tunisia, Syria, Uruguay, Chile, United States, Norway, Greece and Hungary).

Works
(2022) New Creation (working title)
(2017) Inoah
(2013) Crackz
(2008) H3
(2005) H2
(2003) Telesquat
(2002) Too legit to quit
(2001) Me and my choreographer in 63
(2001) From popping to pop or vice-versa

.

Awards and Indications

(2020) The Bessies New York Dance and Performance Awards- 'Inoah'
(2019) "Niteroi Semana de Dança - Homenagem" - Companhia de Ballet da Cidade de Niteroi
(2018) APCA - São Paulo Arts Critics Association - Indicação "Espetáculo" - 'Inoah'
(2010) The Bessies New York Dance and Performance Awards- 'H3'
(2009) 5º Prêmio Bravo Prime de Cultura - "Dance Performance" - 'H3'
(2009) Syndicat professionnel de la Critique de Théâtre, Musique et Danse "Mention spéciale du jury" - 'H3' 
(2008) APCA - São Paulo Arts Critics Association - "Choreographer" - 'H3'
(2005) "Upcoming Choreographer of the Year" 'H2' - Balletanz Magazine
(2004) "Prêmio Cultura nota 10" - Governo do Estado do Rio de Janeiro

.

Mentions
(2019) "Best Dance of 2019" - 'Inoah'- The New York Times
(2018) "Tous nos spetacles préférés de 2018" - 'Inoah'- Le monde
(2018) "Dança: O melhor do Ano" - 'Inoah'- O Publico
(2017) "Performances of the year" - 'Inoah'- O GLOBO
(2013) "Performances of the year" - 'Crackz'- O GLOBO
(2010) "Vibrant Scene’s 20th-Century Base" - The New York Times
(2008) "Performances of the year" - 'H3'- O GLOBO
(2008) "Performances of the year" - 'H3'- Jornal do Brasil
(2008) "Performances of the year" - 'H3' - Guia Folha de S.Paulo
(2005) "Performances of the year" - 'H2' - O GLOBO
(2003) "Performances of the year" - "Telesquat" - O GLOBO
(2002) "Personagem do ano - Dança" - O GLOBO
(2001) "Performances of the year" - "Me and my choreographer in 63" - O GLOBO

.

External links
Grupo de Rua, Company website
 Something Great, international management & bookings
Centre Georges Pompidou Paris
Kunsten Festival des Arts Brussels
Fest-mit-Pina Bausch 2008 Essen
REDCAT Los Angeles
Wexner Center for the Arts Ohio
Festival Tokyo
The Walker Arts Center Minneapolis

.

Articles
 "Grupo de Rua at BAM, New York — the embodiment of turmoil" - Financial Times
"Brazil Is Burning, and We’re Just Performing a Lot of Abstract Gestures"- The New York Times
 "Visto con voi: la nuova danza brasiliana a Torino" - La Guida
 "Review: Brazilian Troupe Grupo de Rua in a Dark Urban Vision" - The New York Times
 "Wutentbrannt und wunderbar" - Neue Zürcher Zeitung
 "De danse en performance, l’état des corps du Brésil" - La Libre
"Um coreógrafo no futuro" O Público 
"A arte da ameaça do brasileiro Bruno Beltrão" Le Monde
"Running backwards in advance of oneself" Corpus.be
"Here is dancing the future" Berner Zeitung
"Brazilian street meets the stage" The New York Times
"The reinvention of Breakdance" Der Standard
"Ok, Isso que eu faço não é Hip Hop" Balletanz Magazine
"The break dance's quiet tenderness" Der Standard 
"Intelectual Hip hop" Tagesspiegel
"Quando o corpo é multiplicado por 9" Jornal O Estado de S. Paulo
"Coreógrafo de Niterói dança hoje em Londres" Folha de S.Paulo
"Goethe Institut - Interview" Goethe Institut
"Grupo de Rua comes to Southern California" Los Angeles Times

1979 births
Living people
Brazilian choreographers
People from Niterói